James Lind (1716–1794) was a Scottish physician.

James or Jim Lind may also refer to:

 James Lind (naturalist) (1736–1812), natural philosopher, Scottish physician, Frankenstein inspiration, cousin of James Lind (1716–1794)
 James Lind (Royal Navy officer) (1765–1823), captain in the Royal Navy, son of James Lind (1716–1794)
 James F. Lind (1900–1975), American politician
 Jim Lind (politician) (1913–1980), Canadian Member of Parliament
 Jim Lind (American football) (born 1947), American football coach
 J. D. Lind (James Douglas Lind, born 1985), Canadian curler